Weapon storage areas (WSA), also known as special ammunition storage (SAS), were extremely well guarded and well defended locations where NATO nuclear weapons were stored during the Cold War era.

In most situations, the WSA or SAS areas were located inside the perimeter of an army barracks or an air base in NATO territory, but in a few cases they were located deep inside wooded areas and miles away from a military base.

Due to changes in the political landscape, the number of special weapons in Europe has been drastically decreased. Moreover, the introduction of the WS3 Weapon Storage and Security System has made WSAs obsolete.

At present, few WSAs are still operational as modern day special weapons are stored in the floors of concrete aircraft shelters and placed under 24/7 electronic surveillance.

Examples
Bossier Base, former  WSA
Killeen Base
Lake Mead Base/Nellis Area 2
Manzano Base
Medina Annex prior to NSA/CSS Texas Cryptologic Center being located there
Naval Submarine Base Kings Bay
Naval Base Kitsap, former Naval Submarine Base Bangor
 NATO SAS Werl (Germany) after decommissioning seen from inside out, part 1
 Part 2 of the video

Nuclear warfare
Military logistics
Military terminology